Adlešič is a surname. Notable people with the surname include:
 
Đurđa Adlešič, Croatian politician 
Juro Adlešič, Slovenian lawyer and politician 
Miroslav Adlešič, Slovene physicist, specialist in acoustics, author of numerous books and textbooks on physics.